Vivek Krishna Tankha (born 21 September 1956) is an Indian lawyer and politician, serving as a Senior Advocate at the Supreme Court of India and as a Member of Parliament. He previously had served as the Additional Solicitor General of India and Advocate General of Madhya Pradesh.

He was elected to the Rajya Sabha, upper house of the Parliament of India from Madhya Pradesh as a member of the Indian National Congress. He was the Congress party's candidate for Lok Sabha from Jabalpur in the 2014 Indian general elections and the 2019 Indian general elections.

He was reelected as a Rajya Sabha MP in 2022.

Career

Vivek Tankha was one of the youngest Advocate Generals of Madhya Pradesh (16 February 1999 to 15 November 2003) Tankha was Designated Senior Advocate by the Full Court of the High Court in 1999. He was also the first lawyer from Madhya Pradesh to have been appointed Additional Solicitor General of India. He had played a major role in resolving disputes between Madhya Pradesh and Chhattisgarh after the latter was created in November 2000. Tankha has been representing the Whistle blower in Vypam Scam Case of Madhya Pradesh. He is also Chairman at Legal Department of AICC. K C Mittal is Secretary  Legal Department of AICC.

Social Activities

	As Chairman of the committee of Rotary Clubs of Jabalpur, he helped the village of Ghana Khamaria, Madhya Pradesh, India to rebuild 66 homes in the aftermath of the earthquake that hit Jabalpur in May 1997. At the time of the devastating Super Cyclone in the year 2000 which hit the State of Orissa, he extended material help by mobilizing and sending 18 Railway wagon loads of food grains/relief materials for the affected people with the assistance of local Rotarians and Rotary Clubs. He facilitated relief by sending doctors, medicines, food, and clothes and established a temporary hospital in the aftermath of the massive earthquake that hit Bhuj, in the State of Gujarat, India on 26 January 2002 with Rotary clubs and civil society. He led Rotary relief team to Uri, Kashmir in 2005 to facilitate the relief operation after the mammoth earthquake, which hit both sides of the Line of Control in Kashmir.

He organizes regular health camps to spread awareness and address medical needs of less fortunate masses in remote and backward areas of India. His first Health Mission RAHAT-I was at Mandla in Madhya Pradesh, India for Tribal population, described by "India Today" Magazine in its 12 April 2010 edition as a “Mother of all Health Missions” organized in the Rotary World. The camp addressed medical needs of 49,634 tribal patients and performed approximately 4600 surgeries and procedures in a period of seven days – 6 March 2010 to 13 March 2010. Other medical missions were also in tribal belts of Madhya Pradesh & Chhattisgarh namely, Chhindwara-II, Jhabua-III, Neemuch-IV, Vidisha-V, Jabalpur-Dindori –VI and Jagdalpur-VII.
(Total patients – 3.25 Lakhs with Surgeries and procedures 22000 approx). Medical Mission RAHAT 2016 in district Shahdol (M.P.) from 13–18 February- 2016 covered the tribal districts of M.P. & Chhattisgarh including the districts of Anooppur, Dindori, Mandla, outer periphery of Jabalpur, Singarauli up to the border of Chhattisgarh. In view of the enviable volunteer assistance rendered by several top doctors and surgeons, Mr. Montek Singh Ahluwalia described these camps as perhaps the best example of Public-Private Partnership in India.

Mr Vivek Tankha is Chairman of Justice Tankha Memorial Rotary Institute for Special Children. Justice Tankha Memorial Trust helped establish and runs schools in Central India which are dedicated to the upliftment of specially abled children. The institution for special children provides educational, cultural, therapeutic, and vocational facilities for children who are hearing impaired, have mental retardation and cerebral palsy, or have autism. These schools for children with special needs have been established in the towns of Jabalpur, Bhopal, Gwalior and Mandla (a tribal district) in Madhya Pradesh, India; as also in Bilaspur, Chhattisgarh, India. Today more than 700 children with special needs are taken care of at these schools.

As the initiative of Justice Tankha Memorial Trust, five well-equipped and modern blood banks have been established in public hospitals in Madhya Pradesh, India, i.e., at Jabalpur, Narsinghpur, Chhindwara, Mandla and Shahdol, to help poor & needy patients by arranging sponsorship of Rupees Fifty Lacs for each Rotary Blood Bank on a daily basis extended medical help to hundreds of people seeking medical relief- be it be heart, kidney, liver, pediatrics, guynic etc in Jabalpur and help in their shifting to bigger hospitals in Metro cities.

He has introduced a bill in Rajya Sabha in 2022, to restore Kashmiri Pandits. The bill is titled "KASHMIRI PANDITS (RECOURSE, RESTITUTION, REHABILITATION
AND RESETTLEMENT) BILL, 2022".

References

External links
Vivek Tankha on Twitter
Vivek Tankha on Facebook

Indian National Congress politicians
Rajya Sabha members from Madhya Pradesh
Living people
1956 births